Jonathan Windy Boy (born August 28, 1958) is an American politician, currently serving as a member of the Montana House of Representatives. From 2008 to 2016, he served in the Montana Senate. In 2019, he stepped down from legislative duties after being found guilty of sexual misconduct. The sexual misconduct stemmed from inappropriate texts he sent in 2017 to female colleagues between mid-August and October. Allegations and  anecdotes began circulating of his history sexual misconduct on the reservation. He ran for re-election as Representative of District 32 and served in the 2021 session.

Career 
In 2002, Windy Boy was elected to the Montana House of Representatives, representing House District 32. He has been a member of the Tribal Council of the Chippewa Cree Tribe since 1999. He was elected Chippewa Cree Tribe Vice-chairman from 2008 to 2010. In 2011, he opposed changing Montana law to revoke the drivers license of any teenager caught in possession of alcohol, but agreed that any teenager with a DUI should be banned from holding a driver's license until age 18. In 2012, he endorsed a Republican candidate, Sandy Welch, for State Superintendent of Education.

In 2013, he introduced Montana Senate bill 342, which allocates $2 million for a Montana Indian Language Preservation Pilot Program, which will "provide funding to Montana’s eight tribes to develop materials to keep their languages alive for future generations." He serves as a full-time THPO for the Chippewa-Cree Tribe of Rocky Boy where he works with a private business on section 106 consultation process.

Personal life 
Born and raised in Box Elder, Montana, he is divorced and has two children. He is known as a traditional dancer, and has worked in oil field exploration, and as a drug and alcohol prevention speaker.

References

External links
 Montana House of Representatives - Jonathan Windy Boy official MT State Legislature website
 Project Vote Smart - Representative Jonathan Windy Boy (MT) profile
 Official Jonathan Windy Boy website
 Ballotpedia

1958 births
21st-century American politicians
Living people
Democratic Party members of the Montana House of Representatives
Democratic Party Montana state senators
Native American state legislators in Montana
Ojibwe in Montana
People from Blaine County, Montana
People from Box Elder, Montana